Gavin Johnson (born 10 October 1970) is an English former professional footballer who played as a left-back or midfielder.

Career
Born in Stowmarket, Johnson started his career with nearby Ipswich Town, making his debut in a 2–0 win over Barnsley on 21 February 1989. He moved on to Luton Town in 1995, but was sold to Wigan Athletic for £15,000 in the same year. After three years at Wigan, he spent a season in Scotland with Dunfermline Athletic, before returning to East Anglia to join Colchester United  in 1999.

After being released by Colchester in 2005 he had a brief spell with Boston United, before spending a season with Northampton Town and then Oxford United. In 2007, he returned to Suffolk to play for Bury Town, before moving onto Walsham-le-Willows in 2010.

At the start of the 2011–12 season, Johnson signed for Isthmian League Division One North club Needham Market.

Honours

Club
Ipswich Town
 Football League Second Division Winner (1): 1991–92

Wigan Athletic
 Football League Division Three Winner (1): 1996–97

Northampton Town
 Football League Two Winner (1): 2005–06

References

External links

Player profile Bury Town
 Walsham-le-Willows

Living people
1970 births
People from Stowmarket
Association football fullbacks
Association football midfielders
English footballers
Ipswich Town F.C. players
Luton Town F.C. players
Wigan Athletic F.C. players
Dunfermline Athletic F.C. players
Colchester United F.C. players
Boston United F.C. players
Northampton Town F.C. players
Oxford United F.C. players
Bury Town F.C. players
Walsham-le-Willows F.C. players
Needham Market F.C. players
Premier League players
English Football League players
Scottish Premier League players